Curzon Cinemas are a chain of cinemas based in the United Kingdom, mostly in London, specialising in art house films. They also have a video on demand service, Curzon Home Cinema.

History
Curzon Cinemas were established in 1934 when Harold Wingate, who imported unknown films during the post World War I period, opened the first cinema in Mayfair. The second location, Curzon Bloomsbury, opened in 1972. In 1976 Curzon Artificial Eye, the film distribution company was launched.

On 23 December 2019, American-based Cohen Media Group acquired Curzon Cinemas, including Curzon Artificial Eye.

In March 2020, Curzon Cinemas and all other public cinemas in the UK closed until summer 2020 due to a national lockdown in response to the ongoing COVID-19 pandemic.

Locations

Curzon Cinemas currently have 17 cinema complexes throughout the United Kingdom.

Franchised locations
Curzon Cinemas have also franchised their name and operate in partnership with a number of other locations.

Future locations
Curzon intends to reopen its Chelsea cinema (which was closed in May 2018) in 2023 after the site is redeveloped by Cadogan Estates.

Related companies
Curzon Film is a sister company of Curzon Cinemas. They cover acquisition, production and distribution rights to films across the UK and Ireland.

Curzon Home Cinema, a video on demand service.

References

External links

 – official site
Curzon – corporate site
Curzon Sea Containers (Southbank)

Cinema chains in the United Kingdom
Entertainment companies established in 1934
1934 establishments in the United Kingdom
BAFTA Outstanding British Contribution to Cinema Award